Karl Otten (29 July 1889 Oberkrüchten – 20 March 1963, Minusio) was a German expressionist writer and broadcaster.

Karl was an anti-militarist activist during the First World War, but was arrested for his actions. On 16 November 1918 he signed the Appeal published by the Antinational Socialist Party. In 1919 he co-founded Der Gegner with Julius Guomperz.

In 1930 he met Ellen Kroner with whom he worked closely and married her in 1939.

Following the Nazi seizure of power in 1933, Otten first went to Spain and fought in the Spanish Revolution. Following its defeat he went to London, where he wrote 120 radio broadcasts for the BBC. He went blind in 1944 and later moved to Switzerland.

Works
 1913, Die Reise nach Albanien,  Berlin: Heinrich F. S. Bachmair-Verlag
 1919, Lona, novel
 1918, Der Erhebung des Herzens Der Rote Hahn No. 4, Berlin: Verlag Die Aktion 
 1927, Prüfung zur Reife, novel, List Verlag
 1931, Der schwarze Napoleon, biography of Toussaint L'Ouverture Berlin: Atlantis

Archive
The Ellen Otten Family Papers (Leo Baeck Institute, New York) contain much information about Karl Otten.

References

1889 births
1963 deaths
People from Viersen (district)
People from the Rhine Province
German Expressionist writers
Writers from North Rhine-Westphalia
German broadcasters
German political writers
BBC radio presenters